Lindsay Creek is a stream in Humboldt County, California, in the United States. It is a tributary of the Mad River.

Lindsay Creek was named for a pioneer settler.

See also
List of rivers of California

References

Rivers of Humboldt County, California
Rivers of Northern California